In mathematics, the tensor product of two fields  is their tensor product as algebras over a common subfield. If no subfield is explicitly specified, the two fields must have the same characteristic and the common subfield is their prime subfield.

The tensor product of two fields is sometimes a field, and often a direct product of fields; In some cases, it can contain non-zero nilpotent elements.

The tensor product of two fields expresses in a single structure the different way to embed the two fields in a common extension field.

Compositum of fields

First, one defines the notion of the compositum of fields. This construction occurs frequently in field theory. The idea behind the compositum is to make the smallest field containing two other fields. In order to formally define the compositum, one must first specify a tower of fields. Let k be a field and L and K be two extensions of k. The compositum, denoted K.L, is defined to be  where the right-hand side denotes the extension generated by K and L. Note that this assumes some field containing both K and L. Either one starts in a situation where an ambient field is easy to identify (for example if K and L are both subfields of the complex numbers), or one proves a result that allows one to place both K and L (as isomorphic copies) in some large enough field.

In many cases one can identify K.L as a vector space tensor product, taken over the field N that is the intersection of K and L. For example, if one adjoins √2 to the rational field  to get K, and √3 to get L, it is true that the field M obtained as K.L inside the complex numbers  is (up to isomorphism)

(This type of result can be verified, in general, by using the ramification theory of algebraic number theory.)

Subfields K and L of M are linearly disjoint (over a subfield N) when in this way the natural N-linear map of

to K.L is injective. Naturally enough this isn't always the case, for example when K = L. When the degrees are finite, injectivity is equivalent here to bijectivity. Hence, when K and L are linearly disjoint finite-degree extension fields over N, as with the aforementioned extensions of the rationals.

A significant case in the theory of cyclotomic fields is that for the nth roots of unity, for n a composite number, the subfields generated by the pk&hairsp;th roots of unity for prime powers dividing n are linearly disjoint for distinct p.

The tensor product as ring

One can define the product  to be  (see Tensor product of algebras). This formula is multilinear over N in each variable; and so defines a ring structure on the tensor product, making  into a commutative N-algebra, called the tensor product of fields.

Analysis of the ring structure

The structure of the ring can be analysed by considering all ways of embedding both K and L in some field extension of N. Note that the construction here assumes the common subfield N; but does not assume a priori that K and L are subfields of some field M (thus getting round the caveats about constructing a compositum field). Whenever one embeds K and L in such a field M, say using embeddings α of K and β of L, there results a ring homomorphism γ from  into M defined by:

The kernel of γ will be a prime ideal of the tensor product; and conversely any prime ideal of the tensor product will give a homomorphism of N-algebras to an integral domain (inside a field of fractions) and so provides embeddings of K and L in some field as extensions of (a copy of) N.

In this way one can analyse the structure of : there may in principle be a non-zero nilradical (intersection of all prime ideals) – and after taking the quotient by that one can speak of the product of all embeddings of K and L in various M, over N.

In case K and L are finite extensions of N, the situation is particularly simple since the tensor product is of finite dimension as an N-algebra (and thus an Artinian ring). One can then say that if R is the radical, one has  as a direct product of finitely many fields. Each such field is a representative of an equivalence class of (essentially distinct) field embeddings for K and L in some extension M.

Examples

X&hairsp;&hairsp;3 − 2,

That incidentally shows that R = {0} in this case.

An example leading to a non-zero nilpotent: let

P(X) = X&hairsp;&hairsp;p − T

with K the field of rational functions in the indeterminate T over the finite field with p elements (see Separable polynomial: the point here is that P is not separable). If L is the field extension K(T 1/p) (the splitting field of P) then L/K is an example of a purely inseparable field extension. In  the element

is nilpotent: by taking its pth power one gets 0 by using K-linearity.

Classical theory of real and complex embeddings

In algebraic number theory, tensor products of fields are (implicitly, often) a basic tool. The totally real number fields are those for which only real fields occur: in general there are r1 real and r2 complex fields, with r1 + 2r2 = n as one sees by counting dimensions. The field factors are in 1–1 correspondence with the real embeddings, and pairs of complex conjugate embeddings, described in the classical literature.

This idea applies also to  where p is the field of p-adic numbers.

Consequences for Galois theory

This gives a general picture, and indeed a way of developing Galois theory
(along lines exploited in Grothendieck's Galois theory). It can be shown that for separable extensions the radical is always {0}; therefore the Galois theory case is the semisimple one, of products of fields alone.

See also
Extension of scalars—tensor product of a field extension and a vector space over that field

Notes

References

External links
MathOverflow thread on the definition of linear disjointness

Field (mathematics)